Faulkbourne is a small settlement and civil parish in the Braintree district of Essex, England, about 2 miles (3 km) northwest of Witham. The population at the 2011 Census was included in the civil parish of Fairstead. The name of the village (which was also spelled "Faulkbourn") is said to be derived from the Old English words "falk" or "folc" (meaning "folk") and "burn" (meaning "well").

The manor of Faulkbourne was centred on Faulkbourne Hall and nearby St Germanus' Church. The manor had been held by Turbin in the time of Edward the Confessor and was given by William the Conqueror to Hamo Dapifer, whose granddaughter passed it by marriage to Henry I's natural son, Robert, Earl of Gloucester. It subsequently belonged to Richard de Luci, Lord Chief Justice of England and Sheriff of Essex in 1156. In 1243 Richard de Redvers succeeded to the manor.

After passing through several hands, the manor was left by Sir Thomas Montgomery to his nephew John Fortescue in 1494, whose descendant of the same name sold it to Sir Edward Bullock in 1637. The Bullock family lived at Faulkbourne until the turn of the 20th century, and included Colonel John Bullock, Member of Parliament for several Essex constituencies for 56 years. In April 1885, Princess Louise, Duchess of Argyll (Queen Victoria's daughter) stood as sponsor at the christening of a member of the Bullock family.

Notable people
Sir Edward Bullock (c. 1580–1644), landowner
John Bullock (1731–1809), landowner and politician
William Bullock (1837–1904), cricketer and journalist
Rev. Francis William Galpin (1858–1945), clergyman and musicologist
Rev. Frederick Spurrell (1824–1902), clergyman and archaeologist

References

External links
 White Notley & Faulkbourne Parish Council

Braintree District
Civil parishes in Essex
Hamlets in Essex